Kronecker is a German surname. Notable people with the surname include:

 Hugo Kronecker (1839–1914), German physiologist, brother of Leopold
 Leopold Kronecker (1823–1891), German mathematician

German-language surnames